Killing Heat (released in Sweden as Gräset sjunger) is a 1981 film based on Doris Lessing's 1950 novel The Grass Is Singing. It stars Karen Black and  John Thaw and was filmed in Zambia and Sweden. The film was released in Zimbabwe as The Grass is Singing.

Plot 
The film takes place in apartheid-era South Africa in the 1960s (unlike the novel which was set in Southern Rhodesia). Mary, a city woman, marries a farmer named Dick Turner. Mary leaves the comfortable familiarity of her urban life and goes to live on Dick's struggling farm.  Mary has little experience handling Africans as servants or employees and is harsh and tactless in her treatment of the African farm workers. Mary runs away by herself (to the town of Livingstone, crossing the bridge at Victoria Falls by train—which takes her into what was pre-1964 Northern Rhodesia), only to find that she cannot get her old job back, and has nowhere to take permanent refuge and no means of financial support. She returns to the farm. Mary slowly becomes insane and breaks the Rhodesian taboo of inter-racial over-familiarity with the African houseboy, Moses. After Mary and Moses are accidentally observed by a newly appointed farm manager in the act of taking what would be considered liberties, Dick decides to send Mary away from the farm. Learning of Mary's forthcoming departure, Moses murders Mary during a rainstorm. Moses is arrested by the police and led off in handcuffs.

Cast 
 Karen Black as Mary Turner
John Thaw as Dick Turner
John Kani as Moses
Patrick Mynhardt as Charlie Muller
John Moulder-Brown as Tony Marston
Margaret Heale as Ellen Muller

References

External links 
 

1981 films
English-language Swedish films
Films based on British novels
Adultery in films
Films set in the 1940s
Films set in Rhodesia
Films set in the British Empire
Zambian drama films
English-language Zambian films
1981 drama films
1980s English-language films
Australian drama films
Swedish drama films
1980s Swedish films

af:The Grass Is Singing
sr:Трава пева
sv:Gräset sjunger